Udo Düllick (3 August 1936 in Werder – 5 October 1961 in Berlin) was one of the first to die at the Berlin wall. He drowned while fleeing in the Spree river between Friedrichshain and Kreuzberg near the Oberbaumbrücke in Berlin, Germany.

Life 

Düllick studied engineering in Dresden and was employed by the Reichsbahn. He lived with his parents in Werder, near Strausberg, east of Berlin. There, he grew up with his older brother in a Catholic family. The father remarried after the death of the mother. His brother went to West Germany in 1959.

On the evening of 5 October 1961 he attended a company party of the Reichsbahn. There he came into conflict with a supervisor, where he tore off the Shoulder marks of his Reichsbahn uniform. He was then fired on the spot. With a taxi he drove northward to Berlin's East Port and jumped into the water. While he was swimming towards the west, the border guards gave first warning shots. Finally, they shot deliberately at the fugitive. He drowned without getting hit. The fire department of West Berlin recovered the corpse of the fugitive, whose name was unknown at that moment.

During the escape, people from West-Berlin watched the action. However, they had to stay on the wharf because the Spree fully belonged to the territory of East Berlin. The day after his death, 2.500 people from West Berlin gathered at Gröbenufer, for a funeral. The brother of Udo Düllick, who was living in the West, identified the corpse. The funeral service was on 18 October 1961 at the Jerusalem cemetery in Berlin-Kreuzberg. Gröbenufer today has a memorial stone, which was erected the same year. A cross of the memorial White Crosses on Reichstagufer commemorates Udo Düllick.

See also 
 List of deaths at the Berlin Wall
 Berlin Crisis of 1961

Literature 
 Christine Brecht:  Udo Düllick , in:  Die Toten an der Berliner Mauer. Ein biographisches Handbuch 1961–1989 , Links, Berlin 2009, pp 51–53.

Links 

 Short portrait on  www.chronik-der-mauer.de

References

Deaths at the Berlin Wall
1936 births
1961 deaths
People from Bezirk Frankfurt
1960s in Berlin
People from Märkisch-Oderland
Deaths by drowning
East German defectors